Mthatha River or Umtata River is a river in the Eastern Cape Province in South Africa. The river flows into the Indian Ocean in an estuary located near Coffee Bay. The Mthatha river flows in a southeastern direction and is approximately 250 km long with a catchment area of 2,600 km.  Mthatha Town (Umtata) is named after it.

Its main tributaries are the Ngqungqu River and the Cicira River.

The Mthatha River marks the southern limit of the Pondoland region.

Dams
Presently this river is part of the Mzimvubu to Keiskamma Water Management Area.
Mthatha Dam
Mabeleni Dam

See also 
 List of rivers of South Africa
 List of estuaries of South Africa
 List of dams and reservoirs in South Africa

References

External links
The Ecological Health of the Mthatha River
180° view of Mthatha River Mouth
Invasive alien plants along Mthatha river

Rivers of the Eastern Cape
Internal borders of South Africa